Albert Wilfred Stanek (December 24, 1943 – May 8, 2018), nicknamed "Lefty", was a Major League Baseball pitcher who played in  with the San Francisco Giants. Stanek had a 0–0 record, with a 4.73 earned run average, in 11 games (all in relief) during his brief MLB career. In 13 innings pitched, he permitted seven earned runs on ten hits and 12 bases on balls; he struck out five.

Born in Springfield, Massachusetts, he was signed by the Giants in 1962 after graduating from Chicopee High School and spent the 1963 season at age 19 with the MLB team under the terms of the bonus rule.  His professional career lasted from 1962–1967, all in the Giants' system, and he compiled a 29–37 won/lost mark with a 3.51 ERA in 557 minor league innings.

Stanek died May 8, 2018.

References

External links

1943 births
2018 deaths
Baseball players from Springfield, Massachusetts
Major League Baseball pitchers
People from Chicopee, Massachusetts
Phoenix Giants players
San Francisco Giants players
Springfield Giants players
Tacoma Giants players
Waterbury Giants players